Song Liang (born December 1963) is a former Chinese politician who spent most of his career in north China's Inner Mongolia. As of February 2021 he was under investigation by China's top anti-corruption agency. Previously he served as the Executive Vice Governor of Gansu. Song was the second leader of provincial-ministerial level to be targeted in 2021, after Li Wenxi, former vice chairman of the Liaoning Provincial Committee of the Chinese People's Political Consultative Conference.

Early life and education
Song was born in Shangdu County, Inner Mongolia, in December 1963. In September 1981, he was admitted to Inner Mongolia University, where he majored in plan statistics.

Career in Inner Mongolia
After graduating in July 1985, he was dispatched to the Planning Committee of Inner Mongolia Autonomous Region as an official. Nine years later, he was transferred to the General Office of the Government of Inner Mongolia Autonomous Region, where he eventually became its deputy director in June 2000. He concurrently held the deputy director of Financial Work Office in June 2003,  rising to director in one year later. In August 2011, he was transferred to Chifeng, a prefecture-level city rich in mineral resources, and appointed deputy party chief. More than two years later, he was appointed head of the Department of Transportation of Inner Mongolia Autonomous Region, concurrently holding the party branch secretary position. In November 2005, he was transferred to Wuhai, which has an abundance of coal, and appointed party chief. His predecessor, Hou Fengqi, was sacked for graft in the same month. In November 2016, he was transferred again to Tongliao and appointed party chief, and promoted to member of the standing committee of the Inner Mongolia Party committee, the region's top authority.

Career in Gansu
In March 2017, he rose to become vice governor of Gansu, an economically backward province in northwest China. He was also a member of the standing committee of the Gansu Party committee, the province's top authority. In June 2018, he was promoted again to become executive vice governor of Gansu, a position he held until January 2021. As executive vice governor, he was responsible for forestry, grassland and natural resources. He was involved in the massive deforestation of state owned Dunhuang Yangguan Forest Farm or cases of cutting down thriving forests for grape planting, which made headlines nationwide for the severe damage caused to the Protection Forest in northwest China.

Downfall
On February 1, 2021, he was put under investigation for alleged "serious violations of discipline and laws" by the Central Commission for Discipline Inspection (CCDI), the party's internal disciplinary body, and the National Supervisory Commission, the highest anti-corruption agency of China. On August 15, he was expelled from the Communist Party of China (CPC) and dismissed from public office. On October 7, he was indicted on suspicion of accepting bribes. 

On August 30, 2022, he was sentenced by the Intermediate People's Court of Leshan to life in prison on charges of taking bribes, he was also deprived of his political rights for life, and ordered by the court to have all his personal assets confiscated and turn over all illicit gains and their interests to the state. He took advantage of his former positions in Inner Mongolia and Gansu between 2000 and 2020 to assist others in the establishment of village banks, obtaining loans, job adjustment, business operations and other matters, in return, he illegally accepted cash, equity and real estate worth approximately 79.68 million yuan (11.6 million U.S. dollars) in total.

References

1963 births
Living people
People from Shangdu County
Inner Mongolia University alumni
Nankai University alumni
People's Republic of China politicians from Inner Mongolia
Chinese Communist Party politicians from Inner Mongolia